Strictly Come Dancing returned for its seventeenth series with a launch show on 7 September 2019 on BBC One, with the live shows starting on 21 September. Tess Daly and Claudia Winkleman returned as hosts, while Zoe Ball returned to host Strictly Come Dancing: It Takes Two alongside new addition Rylan Clark-Neal.

Craig Revel Horwood, Shirley Ballas and Bruno Tonioli returned to the judging panel. After seven years as a judge, Darcey Bussell did not return to the series. Bussell's replacement was announced on 22 July as Motsi Mabuse, elder sister of professional dancer Oti Mabuse. On 19 October, actor Alfonso Ribeiro returned as a guest judge to cover for Tonioli.

Following the withdrawal of Will Bayley, on 30 October, it was announced that the 2019 final would feature three couples instead of four.

The series was won by former Emmerdale actor and racing driver Kelvin Fletcher and his professional partner Oti Mabuse.

Professional dancers
On 1 March 2019, it was announced that Pasha Kovalev would be leaving the show after eight years as a professional dancer. On 30 July 2019, Nancy Xu was revealed to have been added to the cast of professionals. On 21 August 2019, it was confirmed that both Gorka Márquez and Graziano Di Prima would not have celebrity partners, a change from the previous series; in their place, the three professionals who did not have celebrity partners in series 16 - Neil Jones, Johannes Radebe, and Luba Mushtuk - were all given one for the first time.

Couples
On 31 July 2019, the first three celebrities announced to be participating in the series were David James, Chris Ramsey and Emma Barton. Celebrity reveals continued throughout the next week until the full line-up was revealed on 7 August 2019. Made in Chelsea star Jamie Laing was originally announced as a contestant, but on 5 September 2019, it was announced that he had withdrawn from the show due to a foot injury. Laing was replaced by former Emmerdale actor Kelvin Fletcher on 7 September 2019, though Laing appeared that evening on the previously recorded season launch show. On 3 September 2020, Laing was announced as one of the celebrity participants for Series 18.

Due to a knee injury, sustained when he landed after jumping from a raised platform in studio rehearsals, Will Bayley was unable to perform on 26 October in the live Halloween Week episode. The injury was such that, on 30 October, he withdrew from the competition.

Scoring chart

Average chart

Highest and lowest scoring performances of the series
The highest and lowest performances in each dance according to the judges' scale are as follows.

Dev Griffin and Emma Weymouth are the only celebrities that don't appear on the list

Couples' highest and lowest scoring dances

Weekly scores and songs
Unless indicated otherwise, individual judges scores in the charts below (given in parentheses) are listed in this order from left to right: Craig Revel Horwood, Motsi Mabuse, Shirley Ballas, Bruno Tonioli.

Launch show

Musical guests: Kylie Minogue—"Love at First Sight"/"Better the Devil You Know"/"All the Lovers"/"Dancing"; Mark Ronson feat. Yebba—"Don't Leave Me Lonely"

Week 1
Running order

Week 2
Musical guest: Lewis Capaldi—"Someone You Loved"
 Running order

Judges' votes to save

Revel Horwood: David & Nadiya
Mabuse: David & Nadiya
Tonioli: David & Nadiya
Ballas: Did not vote, but would have voted to save David & Nadiya

Week 3: Movie Week
Musical guest: Harry Connick Jr.—"Anything Goes"
 Running order

Judges' votes to save

Revel Horwood: David & Nadiya
Mabuse: David & Nadiya
Tonioli: David & Nadiya
Ballas: Did not vote, but would have voted to save David & Nadiya

Week 4
Musical guest: Keith Urban—"Never Comin Down"
 Running order

Judges' votes to save

Revel Horwood: Emma W. & Aljaž
Mabuse: Emma W. & Aljaž
Tonioli: Emma W. & Aljaž
Ballas: Did not vote, but would have voted to save Emma W. & Aljaž

Week 5
Individual judge's scores given in the chart below (given in parentheses) are listed in this order from left to right: Craig Revel Horwood, Motsi Mabuse, Shirley Ballas, Alfonso Ribeiro.

Musical guest: Mabel—"Don't Call Me Up"
 Running order

Judges' votes to save

Revel Horwood: Mike & Katya
Mabuse: Mike & Katya
Ribeiro: Mike & Katya
Ballas: Did not vote, but would have voted to save Mike & Katya

Week 6: Halloween Week
Musical guest: Adam Lambert—"Superpower"

 Running order

1 Due to a knee injury in practice, Will was unable to perform. Under the rules of the show, he was given a "bye" to the following week. However, it was later announced that he had withdrawn from the competition.2 Due to a calf injury in rehearsal, Neil was unable to perform, and Kevin stepped in to partner Alex.
Judges' votes to save

Revel Horwood: Mike & Katya
Mabuse: Catherine & Johannes
Tonioli: Catherine & Johannes
Ballas: Mike & Katya

Week 7
Musical guest: Emeli Sandé—"Shine"

 Running order

1 Neil had to sit out for the second week running, so Alex danced with Kevin again.
Judges' votes to save

Revel Horwood: Mike & Katya
Mabuse: Mike & Katya
Tonioli: Mike & Katya
Ballas: Did not vote, but would have voted to save Mike & Katya

Week 8
Musical guest: Luke Evans—"Bring Him Home"

 Running order

Judges' votes to save

Revel Horwood: Michelle & Giovanni
Mabuse: Michelle & Giovanni
Tonioli: Michelle & Giovanni
Ballas: Did not vote, but would have voted to save Michelle & Giovanni

Week 9: Blackpool Week
Musical guests: Westlife—"Hello My Love"/"Uptown Girl"/"World of Our Own"

 Running order

Judges' votes to save

Revel Horwood: Saffron & AJ
Mabuse: Saffron & AJ
Tonioli: Saffron & AJ
Ballas: Did not vote, but would have voted to save Saffron & AJ

Week 10
Musical guest: Andrea Bocelli—"Return to Love"/"Time to Say Goodbye"
Dance guest: Ellie Fergusson—"Keeping Your Head Up"
Running order 

Judges' votes to save

Revel Horwood: Karim & Amy
Mabuse: Karim & Amy
Tonioli: Karim & Amy
Ballas: Did not vote, but would have voted to save Karim & Amy

Week 11: Musicals Week (Quarter-final)
Musical guests: Beverley Knight—"Memory"; Idina Menzel—"Seasons of Love"
Running order 

Judges' votes to save

Revel Horwood: Alex & Neil
Mabuse: Alex & Neil
Tonioli: Chris & Karen
Ballas: Chris & Karen

Week 12: Semi-Final
Dance guest: Carlos Acosta—"Overture from Carmen"
Musical guest: Niall Horan—"Nice to Meet Ya"
Running order

For the Dance Off, Chris & Karen chose to dance their Rumba, while Karim & Amy chose to dance their American Smooth.
Judges' votes to save

Revel Horwood: Karim & Amy
Mabuse: Karim & Amy
Tonioli: Karim & Amy
Ballas: Did not vote, but would have voted to save Karim & Amy

Week 13: Final
Musical guest: Taylor Swift—"Lover"
Running order

Dance chart

 Highest scoring dance
 Lowest scoring dance
 Not performed due to injury
 Couple withdrew that week

Week 1: Cha-Cha-Cha, Foxtrot, Jive, Quickstep, Samba, Tango or Viennese Waltz
Week 2: One unlearned dance (introducing American Smooth, Charleston, Paso Doble, Salsa and Waltz)
Week 3 (Movie Week): One unlearned dance (introducing Rumba and Street/Commercial)
Week 4: One unlearned dance (introducing Contemporary)
Week 5: One unlearned dance
Week 6 (Halloween Week): One unlearned dance
Week 7: One unlearned dance
Week 8: One unlearned dance (introducing Theatre/Jazz)
Week 9 (Blackpool Week): One unlearned dance
Week 10: One unlearned dance (introducing Argentine Tango)
Week 11 (Musicals Week): One unlearned dance
Week 12 (Semi-final): Two unlearned dances
Week 13 (Final): judge's choice, showdance and couple's favourite dance

Ratings
Weekly ratings for each show on BBC One. All ratings are provided by BARB.

References

External links
 

Series 17
2019 British television seasons